The Reis-class submarines are a group of six license built submarines based on the Type 214 submarine for the Turkish Navy.

Project history
On 28 December 2006, the Undersecretariat for Defence Industries of the Turkish Ministry of National Defense issued a request for proposal, which was revised on 12 July 2007. By 22 November 2007, companies such as the DCNS of France, Navantia of Spain, and a German/British consortium consisting of Howaldtswerke-Deutsche Werft GmbH (HDW) and Marine Force International LLP (MFI) had submitted proposals. After completing the evaluation process, the decision was announced on 22 July 2008 to start contract negotiations first with HDW/MFI. By August 2008, the negotiations started. The diesel-electric Type 214 submarine of ThyssenKrupp featuring an air-independent propulsion (AIP) system was selected, and the program begin was set to early 2009.

The contract between the Turkish Undersecretariat for Defence Industries and the HDW/MFI consortium was signed on 2 July 2009. Amounting to 2.06 billion, the project came into force on 22 June 2011. The submarines are to be built at Gölcük Naval Shipyard with material packages supplied by the HDW/MFI. The shipyard's capability is to be improved regarding the construction and outfitting of the submarines.

The Turkish defense industry companies ASELSAN, HAVELSAN, MilSOFT, Defense Technologies Engineering and Trade Inc. (STM), Koç Information and Defense, TÜBİTAK Defense Industries Research and Development Institute, and Meteksan Defense, as well as marine industry companies Gürdesan, AYESAŞ, Sirena Marine, Arıtaş, İ-Marine, are involved in the project as subcontractors.

Production
The production of the Reis-class, formerly Cerbe-class, submarines takes place in two large hangars, Block A and B, of the Submarine Production Plant ("Denizaltı İmalat Fabrikası") at Gölcük Naval Shipyard. Block B is for welding works of submarine hull sheets and putting them together, while Block B is used for assembly and outfitting works and can accommodate three boat at one time.

For the six submarines, the chosen names are TCG Pirireis, TCG Hızırreis, TCG Muratreis, TCG Aydınreis, TCG Seydialireis and TCG Selmanreis, after the 16th-century Ottoman Navy admirals Piri Reis, Kurtoğlu Hızır Reis, Murat Reis the Elder, Aydın Reis, Seydi Ali Reis and Selman Reis.

The first submarine, the TCG Pirireis, was laid down at the Gölcük Naval Shipyard with the welding ceremony taking place on 28 September 2015. The construction of three other Reis-class submarines, namely TCG Hızırreis, TCG Muratreis and TCG Aydınreis, followed. On 22 December 2019, TCG Pirireis was launched and put into a dry dock for outfitting. While the construction of three laid-down vessels was in progress, the first welding of the fifth submarine, the TCG Seydialireis, took place the same day. The lead submarine began sea trials in December 2022.

The six submarines of the class are planned for delivery to the Turksih Navy at one year intervals beginning with the lead boat in 2023.

Characteristics
The Reis-class submarines are Type 214 submarines featuring air-independent propulsion (AIP) using fuel cell technology. The boats are able to deploy heavyweight torpedoes, anti-ship missiles and to lay mines.

See also
STM 500 submarine

References

Submarine classes
Type 214 submarines
Hydrogen-powered submarines